Parque Julio Montevelle is a park in the Old Centre part of Quito, Ecuador. It is located north of Parque de La Basílica and northwest of Parque La Alameda.

References

 https://www.flickr.com/photos/epmmop/14252499130

Parks in Quito